St. Francis College Rochestown, sometimes known as Rochestown College or abbreviated as Roco, is an all-boys secondary school in Rochestown, Cork, Ireland. The school's foundation dates to 1884 when a friary (monastery) was formed by the Franciscan Order.

History
In the 1870s the Capuchin (Franciscan) order of friars opened a church and monastery on the Rochestown-Monkstown road near Cork city. In the 1880s, a school for novitiates (those seeking to join the order) was opened on the site. While this novitiate school was moved to Kilkenny and elsewhere for some decades, in the 1930s the school returned to the Rochestown friary. In the late 1960s and early 1970s, coinciding with a move to free education in the state, the college expanded into the friary itself, and "dormitories were converted into classrooms". The school continues to operate as a voluntary secondary school under the trusteeship of the Capuchin Franciscan Order.

Extra-curricular activities
Sporting and extra-curricular activities in the school include debating, Gaelic football, hurling, soccer, basketball, badminton, orienteering, and chess.

Notable graduates
Alan Cadogan - Cork GAA
 Edwin Fitzgibbon - Capuchin priest and professor of psychology at UCC, who donated the Fitzgibbon Cup for inter-varsity hurling.
John Kelly - Rugby union player with Munster and Ireland
Shane Kingston - Cork GAA
Dominic MacHale - actor (The Young Offenders)
Alex Murphy - actor (The Young Offenders)
Kilian O'Callaghan - ballet dancer and choreographer
Darragh O'Mahony - Rugby union player
Terry Shannon - Lord Mayor of Cork in 2011
Paul Wallace - Rugby union player
Richard Wallace - Rugby union player
 Niall O'Flaherty and Patrick O'Connell - members of The Sultans of Ping FC.

References

External links
 

Secondary schools in County Cork
1884 establishments in Ireland
Educational institutions established in 1884